Monty Python & the Quest for the Holy Grail is an adventure game created by 7th Level in 1996 for Windows. The game is based on the 1975 film Monty Python and the Holy Grail and was the second of three Monty Python games created by 7th Level.

The game's aesthetics are a mixture of photo realistic rendering and the comic style of Terry Gilliam. The objective is to move through the world and collect a series of objects in order to cross the bridge of death. The game also contains a series of sketches and audio clips not present in the film, including an alternative reason for the minstrels' disappearance.

Gameplay
Many mini-games are available to play along the way, including a Tetris clone using dead plague victims, a Whac-A-Mole game where a knight has to spank virgins in a bed (points are deducted for spanking the bare-cheeked women) and a Simon says game where the player has to remember the order in which four different coloured burning witches scream. The majority of the game is a point and click interface, where the player must also collect items to complete puzzles, and complete the missing planks on the bridge of death.

Reception

Global sales of Holy Grail, Complete Waste of Time and Desktop Pythonizer surpassed 650,000 copies by November 1997, which accounted for revenues above $15 million at 7th Level.

A Next Generation critic said Monty Python & the Quest for the Holy Grail "lacks any semblance of decent gameplay". He elaborated that since there is no indicator of where the hot spots are, the gameplay consists of little more than blindly clicking everywhere on the screen to see what happens. Despite this, he said that enthusiasts of the film would probably still enjoy the game due to the previously unseen video clips included on it.

MacUser named Quest for the Holy Grail one of 1996's top 50 CD-ROMs, while Inside Mac Games declared it the year's best comedy game. The latter publication's editors wrote, "Non-Python fans will probably wonder what the big deal is, but even casual followers will be rolling on the floor." The game was a finalist for Computer Gaming Worlds 1996 "Classic/Puzzle Game of the Year" award, which ultimately went to Baku Baku Animal. However, it won the category's Reader's Choice award that year.

Reviews
Pyramid #22 (Dec./Jan., 1996)

Crew
Terry Gilliam – Director
Terry Jones – Director / voice actor
Steve Martino – Creative Director
Alex Yevgenyev – Technical Director
Charles Otte – Producer
Robert Alan Ezrin – Executive Producer
Eric Idle – Executive Producer / Writing Consultant / voice actor
Trent M. Wyatt – Lead Software Engineer
Hollis Leech – Supervising Producer
Jon M. Greenwood – Line Producer
Bert Jennett – Writer
Peter Crabb – Writing Consultant
Ron Wasserman – Music
Michael Palin – Voice actor
Kurt Heiden – Sound Designer

References

External links
 

1996 video games
Adventure games
Classic Mac OS games
Windows games
Monty Python video games
Parody video games
Video games based on films
Video games developed in the United States
Single-player video games
7th Level games